The action at Abraham's Creek was an engagement on September 13, 1864 between Union Army and Confederate States Army forces during a Union reconnaissance in force toward Winchester, Virginia. The action occurred during skirmishing, maneuvering and scouting before the Third Battle of Winchester on September 19, 1864 in the Valley Campaigns of 1864 during the American Civil War. The Union force successfully completed the mission and captured about 173 Confederate prisoners.

The reconnaissance was conducted by the 1st Brigade, 3rd Division of the Cavalry Corps of the Union Army of the Shenandoah under the command of Colonel, later Brigadier General, John Baillie McIntosh in order to determine Confederate strength around the Berryville Pike approaching Winchester. McIntosh's force comprised the 1st Regiment Connecticut Volunteer Cavalry, 3rd New Jersey Volunteer Cavalry, 2nd Regiment New York Volunteer Cavalry, 5th Regiment New York Volunteer Cavalry, 2nd Ohio Cavalry, 18th Pennsylvania Cavalry Regiment and Battery M of the 2nd United States Artillery Regiment.

On September 13, 1864, Union cavalry division commander, Brigadier General James H. Wilson ordered McIntosh to scout the Berryville Pike, also shown as the Berryville–Winchester Road. McIntosh's force moved down the pike and crossed Opequon Creek where his men captured about 30 Confederate prisoners. Due to the attrition in regiments prior to that date, the 8th South Carolina Infantry comprised 14 officers and 92 men. At the same time, McIntosh's men captured 2 officers and 35 men from six different Virginia mounted regiments which had been consolidated with 8 other regiments in Brigadier General William R. Terry's brigade.

On September 17, 1864, McIntosh's force burned a mill on Abraham's Creek near the Winchester Pike and Jones Mill on Opequon Creek.

McIntosh was wounded and lost a leg at the Third Battle of Winchester, two days later.

Notes

References 
 Dyer, Frederick H. A Compendium of the War of Rebellion: Compiled and Arranged From Official Records of the Federal and Confederate Armies, Reports of the Adjutant Generals of the Several States, The Army Registers and Other Reliable Documents and Sources. Dayton, OH: Morningside Books, 1978. . First published 1908 by Dyer Publishing. Retrieved July 23, 2015.
 Eicher, John H., and David J. Eicher, Civil War High Commands. Stanford: Stanford University Press, 2001. .
 Pond, George E. The Shenandoah Valley in 1864. New York: Charles Scribner's Sons" 1884. . Originally published 1883. Retrieved July 25, 2015.
 Starr, Steven. The Union Cavalry in the Civil War: The War in the East from Gettysburg to Appomattox, 1863–1865. Volume 2. Baton Rouge: Louisiana State University Press, 2007. Originally published 1981. .
 The Union Army; A History of Military Affairs in the Loyal States, 1861–65 — Records of the Regiments in the Union Army — Cyclopedia of Battles — Memoirs of Commanders and Soldiers. Wilmington, NC: Broadfoot Publishing, 1997. First published 1908 by Federal Publishing Company. Vol. 5. . Retrieved July 23, 2015.

Frederick County in the American Civil War
Valley campaigns of 1864
Battles of the Eastern Theater of the American Civil War
Union victories of the American Civil War
Conflicts in 1864
1864 in Virginia
Battles of the American Civil War in Virginia
September 1864 events